The 1913 Pittsburgh Pirates season was the 32nd season of the Pittsburgh Pirates franchise; the 27th in the National League. The Pirates finished fourth in the league standings with a record of 78–71.

Regular season

Season standings

Record vs. opponents

Opening Day lineup

Notable transactions 
 April 28, 1913: Rivington Bisland was purchased from the Pirates by the Atlanta Crackers.
 June 24, 1913: Everitt Booe was traded by the Pirates to the Springfield Senators for Fred Kommers. Booe was returned to the Pirates on June 30, with the Pirates sending Maurice Farrell (minors) to the Senators to complete the deal.
 July 1, 1913: Everitt Booe was selected off waivers from the Pirates by the St. Paul Saints.

Roster

Statistics
Batting
Note: G = Games played; AB = At-bats; H = Hits; Avg. = Batting average; HR = Home runs; RBI = Runs batted in

Pitching
Note: G = Games pitched; IP = Innings pitched; W = Wins; L = Losses; ERA = Earned run average; SO = Strikeouts

Notes

References 
 1913 Pittsburgh Pirates team page at Baseball Reference
 1913 Pittsburgh Pirates Page at Baseball Almanac

Pittsburgh Pirates seasons
Pittsburgh Pirates season
Pitts